José Daniel Rodrigues da Costa (31 October 1757–7 October 1832) was a Portuguese poet.

External links
 
 

1757 births
1832 deaths
18th-century Portuguese poets
Portuguese male poets
19th-century Portuguese poets
19th-century male writers
People from Leiria
18th-century male writers